This article is about the particular significance of the year 1729 to Wales and its people.

Incumbents
Lord Lieutenant of North Wales (Lord Lieutenant of Anglesey, Caernarvonshire, Denbighshire, Flintshire, Merionethshire, Montgomeryshire) – George Cholmondeley, 2nd Earl of Cholmondeley 
Lord Lieutenant of Glamorgan – Charles Powlett, 3rd Duke of Bolton (from 26 March)
Lord Lieutenant of Brecknockshire and Lord Lieutenant of Monmouthshire – Sir William Morgan of Tredegar
Lord Lieutenant of Cardiganshire – John Vaughan, 2nd Viscount Lisburne
Lord Lieutenant of Carmarthenshire – vacant until 1755 
Lord Lieutenant of Pembrokeshire – Sir Arthur Owen, 3rd Baronet
Lord Lieutenant of Radnorshire – James Brydges, 1st Duke of Chandos

Bishop of Bangor – Thomas Sherlock
Bishop of Llandaff – Robert Clavering (until 17 February); John Harris (from 19 October) 
Bishop of St Asaph – Francis Hare
Bishop of St Davids – Richard Smalbroke

Events
8 January - Prince Frederick, son of King George II, is created Prince of Wales, nearly two years after his father's accession. 
1 March - A St. David's Society is established by Welsh immigrants in Philadelphia.
13 March - Bussy Mansel, 4th Baron Mansel, marries Barbara Villiers, daughter of William Villiers, 2nd Earl of Jersey.
26 March - Charles Powlett, 3rd Duke of Bolton is sworn in as Lord Lieutenant of Glamorgan, the post having been vacant since 1715. After 1729, all Lords Lieutenant were also Custos Rotulorum of Glamorgan.
19 October - John Harris is consecrated as Bishop of Llandaff.
date unknown
Zachariah Williams is admitted as a poor brother pensioner of the Charterhouse in London.
Lewis Morris, eldest of the noted Morris brothers of Anglesey, becomes a customs official.

Arts and literature

New books
Christmas Samuel - Golwg ar y Testament Newydd
Thomas Sherlock – The Tryal of the Witnesses of the Resurrection of Jesus

Births
6 January - Anne Penny, née Hughes, poet (died 1784)
probable - Joseph Turner, architect (died 1807)

Deaths
29 April - Sir Stephen Glynne, 3rd Baronet, 64
June - Thomas Baddy, Independent minister and author
July - Sir Stephen Glynne, 4th Baronet, 35?
1 September - Sir Richard Steele, satirist, 57
unknown date - Malachi Jones, Welsh clergyman in Pennsylvania

References

1720s in Wales
1729 by country
1729 in Great Britain